opened in Harima, Hyōgo Prefecture, Japan in 1985.

See also

 Hyōgo Prefectural Museum of Archaeology
 List of Historic Sites of Japan (Hyōgo)

References

External links
  Harima Historical Museum

Museums in Hyōgo Prefecture
Harima, Hyōgo
History museums in Japan
Museums established in 1985
1985 establishments in Japan